State Route 457 (SR 457) is a short four-lane divided highway that was recently built in Gibson County, Tennessee that functions as a southwest bypass of Trenton.  The highway is designated as a primary state route throughout its length with a  speed limit and no access control.

Route description

SR 457 originates from a large signalized intersection with US 45W (SR 5) and SR 367.  Northbound US 45W picks up at the south end of SR 457 and continues to form the eastern bypass of Trenton.  SR 457 traverses rural farmland and crosses SR 54 at an at-grade intersection.  SR 457 continues west past this point and terminates at its intersection with SR 104 and Old Highway 104.  Past this intersection, the roadway continues west as a limited access four-lane divided highway with a  speed limit designated as SR 104.

Major intersections

See also
Tennessee Department of Transportation
City of Trenton Highway Map

References

457
Transportation in Gibson County, Tennessee